Lars Ivar Moldskred (born 12 November 1978) is a football goalkeeper who have played professional for Hødd, Molde, Lillestrøm, Strømsgodset and KR Reykjavik.

Club career

Moldskred started his professional career in IL Hødd, where he spent 4 seasons and played 142 matches. He scored one goal for Hødd during his stay there.

In 2004, he moved to Molde FK. He played 22 matches for them, before moving to Lillestrøm SK. He was not regarded as the first choice there, and was out on loan to Strømsgodset in the 2009 season.

He signed for KR Reykjavik until the end of the 2010 season, after Lillestrøm refused to renew his contract, and he left the club as a free agent.

After one year in Iceland, Moldskred joined his youth club Bergsøy IL as goalkeeper coach.

References

1978 births
Living people
Norwegian footballers
Sportspeople from Møre og Romsdal
IL Hødd players
Molde FK players
Lillestrøm SK players
Strømsgodset Toppfotball players
Norwegian First Division players
Eliteserien players
Knattspyrnufélag Reykjavíkur players
Úrvalsdeild karla (football) players
Norwegian expatriate sportspeople in Iceland
Expatriate footballers in Iceland
Norwegian expatriate footballers
Association football goalkeepers